= BetMotion =

Online gambling company

Betmotion
- Industry: Gambling
- Founded: September 2008
- Headquarters: Curaçao
- Revenue: $3.72 Million (2023)

Betmotion is an online gambling company headquartered in Curaçao.

== Overview ==
In 2019, the gambling options consisted of sports betting, casino games (including poker) and bingo.

Also in 2019, Betmotion sponsored Brazilian beach volleyball players Carol Solberg and Maria Elisa for one season.
